Banara regia is a species of plant in the family Salicaceae. It is endemic to Ecuador.  Its natural habitat is subtropical or tropical moist montane forests.

References

Flora of Ecuador
regia
Endangered plants
Taxonomy articles created by Polbot